And That is the debut album from Mike Skinner and Rob Harvey's collaboration, The D.O.T. It was released on Skinner's label The Beats on 22 October 2012.

Critical reception
NME wrote: "Skinner’s always known how far to push a track before it sounds like a joke, and everything on The D.O.T’s debut is pushed to that limit. It works."

Track listing
All tracks composed by Mike Skinner and Rob Harvey
"And a Hero" - 3:20
"You Never Asked" - 3:46 (featuring Clare Maguire and Danny Brown)
"Goes Off" - 2:54
"Weapon of Choice" - 4:57
"Shut Up and Keep Talking" - 2:59
"Like You Used To" - 2:27
"What You Livin' For?" - 3:36
"Right Side of Madness" - 4:11
"Strong Skunk" - 3:06
"Colours That Don't Exist" - 3:16
"Where Did I Go" - 2:46

References

2012 debut albums
Albums produced by Mike Skinner (musician)